Hyponephele is a genus of butterflies of the subfamily Satyrinae in the family Nymphalidae. Most range from Europe into central Asia with a few in northern Africa. They are commonly called meadowbrowns.

Species
Listed alphabetically:
Hyponephele amardaea (Lederer, 1869)
Hyponephele argyrostigma Tuzov & Samodurow, 1997
Hyponephele astorica (Tytler, 1926)
Hyponephele bala Wyatt & Omoto, 1966
Hyponephele baroghila (Tytler, 1926)
Hyponephele brevistigma (Moore, 1893)
Hyponephele cadusia (Lederer, 1869)
Hyponephele capella (Christoph, 1877)
Hyponephele carbonelli Lukhtanov, 1995
Hyponephele cheena (Moore, 1865)
Hyponephele comara (Lederer, [1870])
Hyponephele davendra (Moore, 1865) – white-ringed meadowbrown
Hyponephele difficilis Clench & Shoumatoff, 1956
Hyponephele dysdora (Lederer, 1869)
Hyponephele dzhungarica Samodurow, 1996
Hyponephele filistigma Pagès, 2007
Hyponephele fortambeka Samodurow, 1996
Hyponephele fusca Stshetkin, 1960
Hyponephele galtscha (Grum-Grshimailo, 1893)
Hyponephele germana (Staudinger, 1887)
Hyponephele glasunovi (Grum-Grshimailo, 1893)
Hyponephele haberhaueri (Staudinger, 1886)
Hyponephele hilaris (Staudinger, 1886)
Hyponephele huebneri Koçak, 1980
Hyponephele interposita (Erschoff, 1874)
Hyponephele issykkuli Samodurow, 1996
Hyponephele jasavi Lukhtanov, 1990
Hyponephele kaschmirensis Rühl, 1894
Hyponephele kirghisa (Alphéraky, 1881)
Hyponephele kocaki Eckweiler, 1978
Hyponephele korshunovi Lukhtanov, 1994
Hyponephele kugitanghi Dubatolov & Sergeew
Hyponephele laeta (Staudinger, 1886)
Hyponephele lupina (Costa, 1836) – Oriental meadow brown, branded meadowbrown
Hyponephele lycaon (Kühn, 1774) – dusky meadow brown 
Hyponephele lycaonoides Weiss, 1978
Hyponephele maroccana (Blachier, 1908) – Moroccan meadow brown
Hyponephele maureri (Staudinger, 1887)
Hyponephele murzini Dubatolov, 1989
Hyponephele mussitans Clench & Shoumatoff, 1956
Hyponephele naricina (Staudinger, 1870)
Hyponephele naricoides Gross, 1977
Hyponephele naubidensis (Erschoff, 1874)
Hyponephele neoza (Lang, 1868)
Hyponephele pagmani Churkin, Pljushch & Samodurov, 2011
Hyponephele pamira Lukhtanov, 1990
Hyponephele pasimelas (Staudinger, 1886)
Hyponephele perplexa Wyatt & Omoto, 1966
Hyponephele prasolovi Lukhtanov, 1990
Hyponephele przewalskyi Dubatolov, Sergeev & Zhdanko, 1994
Hyponephele przhewalskyi Dubatolov, Sergeev & Zhdanko, 1994
Hyponephele pseudokirgisa Shchetkin, 1984
Hyponephele pseudomussitans Wyatt & Omoto, 1966
Hyponephele pulchella (C. & R. Felder, [1867])
Hyponephele pulchra (C. & R. Felder, [1867]) – tawny meadowbrown
Hyponephele rubriceps (Herz, 1900)
Hyponephele rueckbeili (Staudinger, 1887)
Hyponephele sheljuzhkoi Samodurov & Tschikolovez, 1996
Hyponephele susurrans Clench & Shoumatoff, 1956
Hyponephele sylvia (Hemming, 1933)
Hyponephele tenuistigma (Moore, 1893)
Hyponephele tristis (Grum-Grshimailo, 1893)
Hyponephele urartua de Freina & Aussem, 1986
Hyponephele wagneri (Herrich-Schäffer, [1846])

References

 
Satyrini
Butterfly genera